Vallini is a surname. Notable people with the surname include:

Agostino Vallini (born 1940), Italian cardinal
André Vallini (born 1956), French politician

See also
Ballini